List of champions of the 1904 U.S. National Championships tennis tournament (now known as the US Open). The men's tournament was held from 21 August to 31 August on the outdoor grass courts at the Newport Casino in Newport, Rhode Island. The women's tournament was held from 21 June to 25 June on the outdoor grass courts at the Philadelphia Cricket Club in Philadelphia, Pennsylvania. It was the 24th U.S. National Championships and the second Grand Slam tournament of the year.

Finals

Men's singles

 Holcombe Ward (USA) defeated  William Clothier (USA) 10–8, 6–4, 9–7

Women's singles

 May Sutton (USA) defeated  Elisabeth Moore (USA) 6–1, 6–2

Men's doubles
 Holcombe Ward (USA) /  Beals Wright (USA) defeated  Kreigh Collins (USA) /  Raymond Little (USA) 1–6, 6–2, 3–6, 6–4, 6–1

Women's doubles
 May Sutton (USA) /  Miriam Hall (USA) defeated  Elisabeth Moore (USA) /  Carrie Neely (USA) 3–6, 6–3, 6–3

Mixed doubles
 Elisabeth Moore (USA) /  Wylie Grant (USA) defeated  May Sutton (USA) /  Trevanion Dallas (USA) 6–2, 6–1

References

External links
Official US Open website

 
U.S. National Championships
U.S. National Championships (tennis) by year
U.S. National Championships
U.S. National Championships (tennis)
U.S. National Championships (tennis)
U.S. National Championships (tennis)
U.S. National Championships (tennis)